Agnes Garrett (12 July 1845 – 1935) was an English suffragist and interior designer and the founder in 1888 of the Ladies Dwellings Company.

Life
Garrett was the daughter of Newson Garrett (1812–1893), a prosperous merchant, and Louisa Garrett (née Dunnell; 1813–1903). She was the seventh of eleven children. She attended a boarding school at Blackheath, near London.

She and her cousin Rhoda Garrett were employed by London architect John McKean Brydon in 1871, giving them an entry into training that no other practice was willing to allow, as architecture was not considered suitable for women. The cousins opened the first interior design company in Britain to be run by women.  R & A Garrett opened in mid 1875, in a flat behind Baker Street station, moving to 2 Gower Street in Bloomsbury c.1884.

Agnes's older sister was Elizabeth Garrett Anderson, who was the first British woman to qualify as a doctor. Elizabeth set up a pioneering hospital for women, renamed after her death the Elizabeth Garrett Anderson Hospital, and Agnes contributed to its design. For example, she designed the fireplace for the entrance hall, which is now open to the public as a historical gallery within the refurbished UNISON headquarters building.

Her younger sister was the leading suffragist Millicent Fawcett. At Jacob Bright's suggestion it was decided to create a London-based organisation to lobby members of parliament concerning women's suffrage. The Central Committee of the National Society for Women's Suffrage first met on 17 January 1872. The first committee included Garrett, as well as Frances Power Cobbe, Priscilla Bright McLaren and Lilias Ashworth Hallett.

Garrett died in 1935.

References 

1845 births
1935 deaths
English suffragists
English interior designers
People from Aldeburgh